Red Queen may refer to:

Literature
 Red Queen (Through the Looking-Glass), a character in Lewis Carroll's Through the Looking-Glass (1871)
 "The Red Queen's Race", a 1949 short story by Isaac Asimov
 The Red Queen: Sex and the Evolution of Human Nature, a popular 1993 science book by Matt Ridley
 The Red Queen (Drabble novel), a 2004 novel by Margaret Drabble
 Queen Redd, the main antagonist of Frank Beddor's 2004 The Looking-Glass Wars series, based on the above Lewis Carroll character
 The Red Queen (Gregory novel), a 2010 historical novel by Philippa Gregory
 The Red Queen (Obernewtyn Chronicles), a 2012 novel by Isobelle Carmody
 Red Queen (novel), a 2015 novel by Victoria Aveyard

Entertainment
 Red Queen (comics), a number of comics characters
 Red Queen to Gryphon Three, a 1974 concept album by the band Gryphon based on the game of chess
 Red Queen, an artificial intelligence, a character in the 2002 Resident Evil films
 The sword wielded by Nero in the 2008 Devil May Cry series
 Sana Kashimura, otherwise called the Red Queen, a character in the 2012 manga and anime series Alice & Zouroku
 "Red Queen" (Gotham), a 2016 episode of the third season of Gotham

Other
 A red Queen (playing card)
 Elisabeth of Bavaria (1876-1965), the Queen of Belgium nicknamed "The Red Queen"
 Red Queen's Hypothesis, an evolutionary hypothesis to the advantage of sex at the level of individuals, and the constant evolutionary arms race between competing species
 Red Queen (EP), a 2003 album by Funker Vogt
 The Red Queen's race, a parable in Alice in Wonderland that has served as the basis of a number of scientific and sociological theories
 The Tomb of the Red Queen, an unidentified Mayan noblewoman
 Red Queen (anti-aircraft gun), a British Army experimental anti-aircraft gun